Smile FM is a network of non-commercial, contemporary Christian radio stations owned by Superior Communications, a nonprofit organization. Most programming originates from studios in Williamston, Michigan (just east of Lansing) and is relayed (with local inserts) by an expanding number of stations throughout the state. The network also has studios in Imlay City, Michigan.

Smile FM was originally two separate networks. The first, The Light, was founded in December 1996, when WLGH Lansing, Michigan began broadcasting. The second, Joy FM, began on December 12, 2000, with WHYT (renamed as WWKM and again as WDTR) in Imlay City. While both played contemporary Christian music, The Light aimed for a younger audience. In June 2004 the two networks were combined to form Smile FM in a "wedding ceremony" conducted at Oldsmobile Park in Lansing. The new name eliminated confusion since many other unrelated stations used The Light and Joy FM names.

The network is notable for putting stations on the air at a low cost. They lease existing towers and manufacture some of their own equipment. Unlike many Christian stations, they play music with only a few short breaks for weather, news, announcements, and features. Smile FM has also pioneered the use of new technology to help distribute and customize its programming, including developing an emergency weather notification system that is faster and more reliable than the required EAS system (which they also operate).

The licenses for the four stations are split between four subsidiaries: Superior Communications, Michigan Community Radio, Northland Community Broadcasters and Smile FM.

In January 2008, Smile FM established WWKM (now WDTR) Imlay City as the flagship of an experimental Smile FM Praise network playing Christian contemporary worship music. Previously, the station had broadcast traditional Christian music and hymns. The Smile FM Praise experiment was ended in 2009 and plans made to move that station to the northern suburbs of Detroit.

The owners have often recycled the call letters of famous Michigan stations of the past for their stations.  WDTR (now WRCJ), WHYT (now WDVD), and WVMV (now WDZH) were once used by Detroit stations. WTAC (now WSNL) was the leading top 40 station in Flint during the 1960s (and, ironically, a pioneering contemporary Christian station during the 1980s). WKPK was used by a popular top 40 station of the 1980s and 1990s in northern Michigan (now WSRT). WAIR was an oldies station in northern Michigan (now WFDX) and the calls were also used for a construction permit for a station in Honor (now WSRJ). WWKM was a now-defunct station in Harrison (and Smile FM's 88.5 FM station in the Alpena area, WSFP, once bore the calls of WWKM's sister station WKKM, which is now WTWS in Houghton Lake).

Others were named for the original formats of the stations. WLGH and WTLI were The Light. All of the stations beginning with WJ were in or scheduled to be in the Joy FM network. All call letters beginning with WDT (WDTE, WDTP, and WDTR) serve portions of the Detroit metropolitan area.

Smile FM Network Stations
The combined footprint of Smile FM's stations covers most of Michigan's densely populated area (though much of West Michigan relies on translators).

Stations owned and operated by Smile FM include:

Translators

Translators rebroadcasting Smile FM include:

Future stations
On October 6, 2022, it was announced that Smile FM has filed a $60,000 deal to purchase WGVU Grand Rapids from Grand Valley State University. The station, along with WGVS AM Muskegon, originally carried an oldies radio format until January 7, 2022, when both stations closed down. Smile FM had already acquired WGVS effective June 28, 2022 for $25,000, but the station is currently silent.

Explanatory notes

References

External links
Smile FM Website

American radio networks

Christian radio stations in the United States
Radio stations established in 1996
1996 establishments in Michigan